Park Center Senior High School (PCSH) is a four-year public high school located in Brooklyn Park, Minnesota, United States, on 7300 Brooklyn Blvd. PCSH is located near the border of two northwest twin cities suburbs, Brooklyn Park and Brooklyn Center, thus the school name "Park Center" is a combination of these city names. The principal is Heather Miller-Cink. Park Center Senior High's mascot is a pirate and the school's sports teams are known as the Pirates. The school's colors are green and gold.

School overview
Park Center Senior High School is one of three public high schools in the Osseo Area School District 279 and one of two public high schools located in the city of Brooklyn Park. (Brooklyn Park is served by 3 school districts:  Osseo Area School District 279, Anoka-Hennepin School District 11, Robbinsdale Area Schools). In August 2007 Park Center became an official International Baccalaureate (IB) School. This designation as an IB World School means Park Center has joined its partner, North View Junior High as one of only 21 MYP programmes in the state of Minnesota. It is currently offering the Middle Years Programme (MYP) to ninth and tenth grade students. The first IB students graduated in 2009. As with North View Junior High, Park Center is a magnet school open to any student in the Northwest Suburban Integration School District (NWSISD.)  Park Center is one of only 20 public schools in Minnesota that are authorized to offer the Diploma Programme. In addition to International Baccalaureate classes, Park Center also offers college-level Advanced Placement classes.

The NWSISD is a consortium of seven districts in the northwest suburban area of Minneapolis which has been formed to promote integration and eliminate racial isolation of students in these districts.  By creating magnet schools in IB, math & science, and in the arts the NWSISD has begun to bring students of diverse backgrounds together in programs based on academic excellence.

PCSCH students come from about 20 different countries and speak roughly 35 different languages. Demographic information lists the student population as 36.3% Black, 33.5% Asian, 19.8% White, 9.6% Hispanic, and 0.9% are American Indian. The student population has 1,361 total students.

Departments: Arts, Business Education, Career and Technology Education, Cooperative Education, EL Department, Family & Consumer Science, Individuals & Societies(Social Studies), Language and Literature (English), Language Acquisition(Spanish, French, Hmong), Mathematics, Music, Physical and Health Education, Sciences, Social Work, Special Education.

Athletics and activities

Basketball
The Pirates girls' basketball team won the 2014 and 2015 MSHSL AAA state championship.

Hockey
The Pirates boys' hockey team won the 2000 MSHSL state championship.

Musical

Park Center also offers a yearly Musical produced by the school.
2020 - Big Fish
2021 - Urine Town
2022 - All Shook Up
2023 - Sponge bob (The Musical)

Notable alumni

Jon Borchardt - Former starting tackle for the Buffalo Bills and Seattle Seahawks.
Dave Brat - United States Congressman from Virginia's 7th district
Amani Hooker - Class of 16 safety, played football for Iowa University, and currently #37 for the Tennessee Titans.
Quinton Hooker (born 1995) - basketball player in the Israeli Basketball Premier League
Tim Jackman - Former NHL right wing for the Anaheim Ducks
Tim Laudner - Former Minnesota Twins catcher.
Pat Neshek - Former professional Major League Baseball player
Ansu Toure - Professional soccer player (footballer), formerly of the Minnesota Thunder.
Krissy Wendell (Pohl) - Former Women's Hockey Olympic silver medalist (Salt Lake City), two-time NCAA Champion University of Minnesota (2004 and 2005)

References

External links

Park Center Senior High's Official District Fact Sheet
Osseo Area Schools - District 279 Official Website
PCSH Activities Calendar
PCSH Activities and Athletics webpage

Public high schools in Minnesota
Educational institutions established in 1971
1971 establishments in Minnesota
Brooklyn Park, Minnesota
International Baccalaureate schools in Minnesota
Schools in Hennepin County, Minnesota
Magnet schools in Minnesota